The Trade and Agriculture Commission (TAC) was created to advise the UK Department of International Trade on matters of agricultural standards to ensure that the UK agriculture sector remains competitive in any free trade agreement,  and advise on any export opportunities that can be opened to the UK agriculture sector. The ATC was set up for six months to submit an advisory report at the end of its work".

The Department of International Trade announced the creation of Agriculture and Trade Commission on the 29 June 2020 after the agriculture sector informed the government of  their concerns regards food quality in any future trade agreement.

Role 
The ATC was to report directly to International Trade minister Liz Truss, and was to advise on:
 Trade policies the Government should adopt to secure opportunities for UK farmers
 Ensuring the sector remains competitive and that animal  welfare and environmental standards in food production are not undermined.
 Advancing and protecting British  consumer interests and those of the developing countries.
 Advising on how the UK engages the WTO to build a coalition that helps to promote higher animal welfare standards across the world.
 Developing trade policy that identifies and opens up new export opportunities for the UK  agricultural industry in particular for SMEs, as this would benefits the UK economy as a whole.

Leadership
The Agriculture Trade Committee will be chaired by food safety expert Tim Smith, a former Chief Executive of the Food Standards Agency and now Tesco Group Technical Director.

Membership 
The Agriculture and Trade Commission consists of the 16 Members.

See also
 Free trade agreements of the United Kingdom

References 

Free trade agreements of the United Kingdom
Department for International Trade
Trade unions in the United Kingdom
Liz Truss